Herbert Polzhuber (24 June 1938 – 27 July 2015) was an Austrian fencer and modern pentathlete. He competed at the 1964, 1968, 1972 and 1976 Summer Olympics.

References

1938 births
2015 deaths
Austrian male fencers
Austrian épée fencers
Austrian male modern pentathletes
Olympic fencers of Austria
Olympic modern pentathletes of Austria
Fencers at the 1964 Summer Olympics
Fencers at the 1968 Summer Olympics
Fencers at the 1972 Summer Olympics
Fencers at the 1976 Summer Olympics
Modern pentathletes at the 1964 Summer Olympics
Fencers from Vienna